Charles Kuehn was an American politician.

From Manitowoc County, Wisconsin, Kuehn served in the Wisconsin State Assembly 1849–1850. From 1856 to 1858, Kuehn served as the Wisconsin State Treasurer.

Notes

People from Manitowoc County, Wisconsin
Members of the Wisconsin State Assembly
State treasurers of Wisconsin